Taxi is a 2004 action comedy film directed by Tim Story and starring Queen Latifah, Jimmy Fallon, Gisele Bündchen, Jennifer Esposito, and Ann-Margret. An incompetent New York City police officer is banned from driving and comes to rely on a talented taxi driver to help him solve a series of bank robberies. The film is a remake of the 1998 French film of the same name and was panned by critics.

Plot

Bicycle courier Belle Williams earns her taxi license and installs a supercharger in her custom-built 1999 Ford Crown Victoria taxicab. Her first customer offers her a $100 tip if she can make it to the Airport in fifteen minutes. She does.

Meanwhile, bumbling detective Andy Washburn crashes his partner's car while on a mission to apprehend a group of robbers, and is demoted to foot patrol duty by his boss Lt. Marta Robbins, who is also his ex-girlfriend. Hearing of a bank robbery, Washburn flags down Belle's taxicab. They arrive at the bank just as a quartet of female Brazilian robbers leave in a BMW E65. Belle recognizes them as models she saw earlier at the airport. Their leader is Vanessa. Police arrive and mistakenly apprehend Belle and Washburn. Belle's cab is impounded, and she is questioned. Washburn promises to get her cab back if she helps him solve the bank robberies.

Washburn takes Belle to his home after her boyfriend kicks her out for missing a dinner date. Washburn's constantly drunk mother brings up embarrassing moments of Washburn's past and talks about why he's such a bad driver. Washburn convinces the impound cop to return Belle's cab. They realize the gang robs banks just before the garbage collection is due. They put the money in the trash, which the garbage man then collects. Washburn is fired for disobeying orders, and Belle is given a final warning for reckless driving. Belle teaches Washburn to drive, and they discover the garbage collector is acting for the gang because they have kidnapped his wife. They recover the garbage collector's wife and all the loot.

The police learn which bank is next to be hit and ambush the robbers, who take Lt. Robbins hostage and escape, followed by Washburn and Belle in her cab. Belle calls on the help of her bicycle courier friends to pinpoint the car. They negotiate a trade of the cash from the garbage truck for Robbins, and try to swap the hostage for the money while driving down the highway. Washburn forces the robbers down a long bridge under construction.

Vanessa fires her gun at them and wounds Belle. While the police arrest Vanessa, Washburn drives Belle to the hospital, singing "This Will Be (An Everlasting Love)". He crashes into the hospital, so Belle can be quickly recovered. 

Belle achieves her dream of driving NASCAR, sponsored by New York banks. Washburn is reinstated for foiling the robberies. Washburn's mother and Robbins attend Belle's first race to cheer her on. Jesse proposes to Belle. As Belle begins the race, Jeff Gordon pulls up as a challenger.

Cast

Reception

Box office 
Taxi was released on October 6, 2004 in 3,001 theaters and opened at #4 at the box office with $12 million in the opening weekend. It went on to gross $36.9 million domestically and $34.4 million from other markets for a worldwide total of $71.3 million, against a production budget of $25 million.

The film was released in the United Kingdom on November 19, 2004, and opened on #5.

Critical response 
On Rotten Tomatoes, the film holds an approval rating of 9% based on 106 reviews, with an average rating of 3.3/10. The site's critical consensus reads, "Silly and unfunny remake of a French movie of the same name." On Metacritic, the film has a weighted average score of 27 out of 100 based on 27 critics, indicating "generally unfavorable reviews". Audiences polled by CinemaScore gave the film an average grade of "B+" on an A+ to F scale.

Mick LaSalle of the San Francisco Chronicle wrote: "How one likes Taxi has everything to do with how one responds to the hapless cop character, played by Jimmy Fallon." LaSalle was also critical of the car chases, calling them "lackluster and fairly unconvincing."
Kirk Honeycutt of The Hollywood Reporter wrote: "This thoroughly repetitive, ill conceived and poorly executed effort -- with an emphasis on the word "effort"—defeats these two talented people more often than not."

Robert Koehler of Variety called the film "embarrassing evidence that even a ragged French original can be better than its American remake. Failing to improve on the inept but hugely successful 1998 Luc Besson vehicle". Roger Ebert of the Chicago Sun-Times states "Oh, this is a bad movie" and "only gets worse as it plows along".
Megan Lehmann of the New York Post dubbed the film "Taxi Drivel" and said: "This witless action comedy begins to insult the audience's intelligence from the opening scene."

Claudia Puig of USA Today wrote: "A surprisingly funny, female-driven romp — as long as you don't question too many plot particulars."

Accolades

The film won and was nominated for a number of awards throughout 2005.

References

External links

 
 
 

Taxi (film series)
2004 films
2004 action comedy films
2000s American films
2000s buddy comedy films
2000s buddy cop films
2000s chase films
2000s English-language films
2000s French films
2000s heist films
2000s police comedy films
2000s screwball comedy films
20th Century Fox films
Action film remakes
American action comedy films
American buddy comedy films
American buddy cop films
American chase films
American crime comedy films
American heist films
American remakes of French films
American screwball comedy films
Comedy film remakes
Crime film remakes
English-language French films
EuropaCorp films
Fictional portrayals of the New York City Police Department
Films about the New York City Police Department
Films about bank robbery
Films about taxis
Films directed by Tim Story
Films produced by Luc Besson
Films scored by Christophe Beck
Films set in New York City
Films shot in Los Angeles
Films shot in New York City
French action comedy films
French buddy comedy films
French crime comedy films
French heist films
African-American films